Upham may refer to:

Places
 Upham, Hampshire, England
 Upham, New Mexico
 Upham, North Dakota
 Upham, Wisconsin, named for Governor William H. Upham
Upham Mansion, Marshfield, Wisconsin, his home
 Upham Parish, New Brunswick
Upper Upham, Wiltshire, England

People
Upham (surname)

Ships
USS Upham (DE-283), a United States Navy destroyer escort converted during construction into the high-speed transport USS Upham (APD-99)
USS Upham (APD-99), a United States Navy high-speed transport in commission from 1945 to 1946